This Time is the third studio album by American R&B singer Chantay Savage. It was released by RCA Records on July 13, 1999 in the United States. Production for the album was handled by several producers, including Kay Fingers, Kenny Flav, Robert Jazayeri, Marc Kinchen, Sean "Mystro" Mather, Keith Sweat, and Daniel Weatherspoon. This Time peaked at number 56 on Billboards US Top R&B/Hip-Hop Albums. The album's only single, "Come Around", peaked at number 62 on the Hot R&B/Hip-Hop Singles & Tracks.

Critical reception 

Allmusic editor Jaime Sunao Ikeda found that This Time "far outdistances" Savage's previous album an wrote: "Savage is presented here with excellent material on which she uses her impressive 'skills' to their best use paying homage to the likes Angela Bofill, Anita Baker, and Chaka Khan along the way by way of her approach and interpretation. This is one of those rare assemblage of songs that is so well sequenced and sung that it is a difficult task to single out outstanding tracks. The production harks back to the day when emotional delivery was placed ahead of perfect phrasing and pitch."

Track listing

Personnel
Credits for This Time adapted from Allmusic.

 Scott Ahaus – mixing  
 Karen Anderson – vocals (background)  
 Craig Bauer – engineer  
 Athena Cage – vocals (background)  
 Yvonne Cage – vocals (background)  
 Kevin "KD" Davis – mixing  
 Andre Debourg – engineer  
 Delegations – vocals (background)  
 Kevin Evans – executive producer  
 Kay Fingers – programming, multi-instruments, producer, engineer, vocal arrangement, mixing  
 Kenny Flav Keyboards, producer  
 Jerry Flowers – keyboards, drum programming  
 Annette Hardeman – vocals (background)  
 Gabriel Hardeman – vocals (background)  
 Karl Heilbron – engineer  
 Charlene Holloway – vocals (background)  
 Paula Holloway – vocals (background)  
 StarrStrukk- drum programming, producer  

 Robert Jazayeri – producer  
 Gercy Johnson – guitar  
 Marc Kinchen – producer  
 Carla Leighton – package Design  
 Ken Lewis – Engineer  
 Henry Marquez – Creative director  
 Sean "Mystro" Mather – producer  
 Joseph Pluchino – photography  
 Matt Prock – engineer  
 Chantay Savage – vocals, vocals (background), executive producer, vocal arrangement  
 Keith Sweat – producer  
 Mark VanBork – engineer  
 Dave Way – mixing  
 Daniel Weatherspoon – keyboards, programming, producer, rhythm arrangements  
 Michael Weatherspoon – cymbals  
 Jeffrey "Woody" Woodruff – yngineer

Charts

References

External links
 Savage Take Over 'This Time' — By Billboard

1999 albums
RCA Records albums
Chantay Savage albums